is a stable of sumo wrestlers, part of the Takasago ichimon or group of stables. It was established in September 1993 by former yokozuna Hokutoumi, who took with him four wrestlers from Kokonoe stable. The stable has so far produced nine sekitori, four of whom have reached the makuuchi division. As of January 2023, it had 21 wrestlers.

Many Hakkaku wrestlers have the kanji 北勝 (pronounced hokuto or hokutō) in their ring name, taken from the former name of their head coach.

Ring name conventions
Many wrestlers at this stable take ring names or shikona that begin with the character  in deference to their coach and the stable's owner, the former Hokutoumi.

Owner
1993-present: 8th Hakkaku Nobuyoshi (rijichō, the 61st yokozuna Hokutoumi)

Notable active wrestlers

Hokutofuji (best rank komusubi)
 (best rank jūryō)

Coaches
Kimigahama Ayumi (toshiyori, former sekiwake Okinoumi)
Azumazeki Seiken (iin, former komusubi Takamisakari)
Jinmaku Tetsuya (iin, former maegashira Fujinoshin)
Ōyama Susumu (consultant, former maegashira Daihi)

Notable former members
Hokutōriki Hideki (former sekiwake)
Kaihō Ryōji (former komusubi)

Referee
Kimura Yōnosuke (makuuchi gyōji, real name Masashi Okuno)
Kimura Kozaburo (juryo gyōji, real name Ryōsuke Miyasaka)

Usher
Daikichi (makuuchi yobidashi, real name Yūji Ōba)

Hairdresser
Tokomichi (Third class tokoyama)
Tokosho (Fifth class tokoyama)

Location and Access
Tokyo, Sumida Ward, Kamezawa 1-16-1
3 minute walk from Toei Oedo Line Ryōgoku Station and 7 minute walk from Sōbu Line Ryōgoku Station
Adjacent to sister stable, Nishikido

See also 
List of sumo stables
List of active sumo wrestlers
List of past sumo wrestlers
Glossary of sumo terms

References

External links 
Official site 
Japan Sumo Association profile
Article on Hakkaku stable

Active sumo stables